SS Baikal was an ice-breaking train ferry that linked the eastern and western portions of the Trans-Siberian Railroad across Lake Baikal.

Ship history
In early 1895 the construction of a ferry across the Lake Baikal began, following the proposal of the Minister of Transport Mikhail Khilkov. On 30 December 1895 a contract with Sir W G Armstrong Whitworth & Co Ltd was signed for the parts of the icebreaking ferry (without woodwork and in disassembled state). By June 1896 the icebreaker had been delivered for assembly to the village of Listvenichnoye.

Before the Circum-Baikal Railway was opened in 1905, Baikal, and later also the Angara, carried two loads a day between piers at Baikal and Mysovaya. After the railway was completed, both ships continued to operate in reserve.

When the Civil War broke out Baikal was equipped with machine guns and cannons by the Red Army. When Irkutsk surrendered to the White Army, Baikal sailed to the Mysovaya pier, the location of the Red Army headquarters.

In August 1918 the icebreaker was damaged by field artillery fire by Czechoslovak Legion troops during the Battle of Lake Baikal. It was burnt at the Mysovaya pier.

In 1920 the damaged hull was refloated  and towed to Port Baikal. It remained untouched until at least 1926, and was later dismantled. There is a possibility that its lower hull, bow propeller, and part of the engines are still at the bottom of the lake at the mouth of the Angara River.

References

External links 

 Great ice-breaker of a sad destiny
 Icebreaker Angara

1899 ships
Ferries of Russia
Trans-Siberian Railway
World War II merchant ships of the Soviet Union
Maritime incidents in November 1939
Ships built on the River Tyne
Ships built in the Soviet Union
Icebreakers of Russia
Ships built by Armstrong Whitworth